The 1986 Atlantic Conference baseball tournament was held from May 9 through 11, 1986 to determine the champion of the NCAA Division I the Atlantic 10 Conference, for the 1986 NCAA Division I baseball season.  This was the eighth iteration of the event, and was held on the campus of Rutgers in Piscataway, New Jersey.   won their second championship and earned the conference's automatic bid to the 1986 NCAA Division I baseball tournament.

Format and seeding
The top two teams in each division advanced to the tournament, with each division winner playing the second place team from the opposite division in the first round.  The teams played a double-elimination tournament.

Results

References

Tournament
Atlantic 10 Conference Baseball Tournament
Atlantic 10 Conference baseball tournament
Atlantic 10 Conference baseball tournament
Baseball in New Jersey
College sports in New Jersey
History of the New York metropolitan area
Piscataway, New Jersey
Sports competitions in New Jersey
Sports in the New York metropolitan area
Tourist attractions in Middlesex County, New Jersey